Dmitry Nikolayevich Kozak (born 7 November 1958) is a Russian politician who has served as the Deputy Kremlin Chief of Staff since 24 January 2020. He previously served as the Deputy Prime Minister of Russia from 2008 to 2020.

Known as the Cheshire Cat because of his smile, Kozak is part of the Vlast' or power group from St. Petersburg close to Putin.

He served previously as the Regional Development Minister in the Russian cabinet headed by Viktor Zubkov from 2007 to 2008. From 2004 to 2007, he served as Presidential Plenipotentiary Representative in the Southern Federal District (North Caucasus and Southern European Russia).

Dmitry Kozak is a close ally of Vladimir Putin, having worked with him in the St Petersburg city administration during the 1990s and later becoming one of the key figures in Putin's presidential team. During the 2004 Russian presidential election, he worked as the head of Putin's election campaign team. Kozak was one of several members of Putin's circle touted in the media as a possible candidate to succeed Putin as president in 2008.

Early life and career
Dmitry Kozak was born on 7 November 1958 in the village of Bandurove, in the Kirovohrad region of the Ukrainian Soviet Socialist Republic (part of the USSR).

From 1976 to 1978, Kozak served in the special forces (Spetsnaz GRU) of the Soviet military's Main Intelligence Directorate (GRU).

After Spetsnaz, he studied at the Vinnitsa Polytechnic Institute before he moved to Leningrad.

Kozak graduated from Leningrad State University (now St. Petersburg State University) in 1985 with a degree in law. 
From 1985 to 1989, he worked in the Leningrad prosecutor's office as a Prosecutor and Senior Prosecutor. He moved into the business sector in 1989, working as head of the legal department at Monolit-Kirovstroy construction company and chief legal consultant for the Association of Trade Ports.

Political career
Kozak worked as a public prosecutor in Leningrad and after the collapse of the Soviet Union, holding various legal offices in the city's administration. In 1998 he became Deputy Governor of Saint Petersburg.

In 1999, along with other St. Petersburg city officials, he joined the government of Vladimir Putin. He was Chief of Staff from 1999 to 2000. Dmitry Kozak became deputy head of the presidential administration and remained in this position under various titles until 2004. In 2003, he briefly entered international politics and unsuccessfully attempted to solve the conflict between Transnistria and Moldova (see Kozak memorandum).

In September 2004, Kozak was appointed Presidential Plenipotentiary Envoy to the Southern Federal District, replacing Vladimir Yakovlev. On 24 September 2007, he was appointed to the new Russian cabinet headed by Viktor Zubkov as regional development minister, succeeding Vladimir Yakovlev again, and leaving his previous position. On 14 October 2008, he became deputy prime minister of Russia and served until 2020. On 15 January 2020, he resigned as part of the cabinet, after President Vladimir Putin delivered the Presidential Address to the Federal Assembly, in which he proposed several amendments to the constitution.

According to Stanislav Belkovsky, Kozak is not well liked by Putin's entourage, but Vladimir Putin does like Kozak, apparently wanting to appoint Kozak as prime minister in 2004 and tapping Kozak as the successor to Putin as president in 2008, however, Dmitry Medvedev won the presidential race.  Alexei Makarkin of the Center for Political Technologies said that Putin trusts Kozak as one of his men.

Dmitry Kozak was the main overseer for the XXII Olympic Winter Games in Sochi.

Following Russia's intervention into Crimea, Kozak was appointed to greatly strengthen Crimea's social, political, and economic ties to Russia.

On the first day of Russian's invasion of Ukraine in 2022, Kozak rang Zelensky aid Andrii Yermak stating it was time for Ukrainians to surrender. Yermak swore and hung up.

Sanctions
On 28 April 2014, following the Crimean status referendum, the U.S. Treasury put Kozak on the Specially Designated Nationals List (SDN), a list of individuals sanctioned as “members of the Russian leadership’s inner circle.” The sanctions freeze any assets he holds in the US and ban him from entering the United States.

On 29 April 2014, Kozak was added to the European Union sanctions list due to his role in the 2014 Crimean crisis. He is barred from entering the EU countries, and his assets in the EU are frozen.

Honours and awards
Order of Merit for the Fatherland
1st class (2014)
2nd class (6 November 2008)
Olympic Order – 2014 (withdrawn on 28 February 2022 due to invasion of Ukraine)
Paralympic Order – 2014 (withdrawn on 3 March 2022 due to invasion of Ukraine)

Notes

References

External links

Dmitry Kozak: Biography on Russian government website (in Russian)
Dmitry Kozak: Biography on Renaissance Capital website

1958 births
People from Kirovohrad Oblast
Deputy heads of government of the Russian Federation
1st class Active State Councillors of the Russian Federation
Living people
GRU officers
Ukrainian emigrants to Russia
Recipients of the Order "For Merit to the Fatherland", 1st class
Recipients of the Order "For Merit to the Fatherland", 2nd class
Recipients of the Paralympic Order
21st-century Russian politicians
Russian individuals subject to the U.S. Department of the Treasury sanctions
Russian individuals subject to European Union sanctions
Russian individuals subject to United Kingdom sanctions